Although the 1995 Minnesota Twins were separated from a world championship by only four years, it seemed like eons.  Because of the 1994–95 Major League Baseball strike, the season got off to a late start.  However, it did not end soon enough, as the team finished with a 56–88 record and in last place in its division.  The team found it impossible to compete against the runaway Cleveland Indians who won 100 games despite the shortened season and finished 44 games ahead of the Twins.  By July, the team was trading away its veterans in a fire sale.  Manager Tom Kelly might have preferred that the strike had continued.

Offseason
 November 4, 1995: Rich Robertson was selected off waivers by the Twins from the Pittsburgh Pirates.
 December 16, 1995: Matt Merullo was signed as a free agent by the Twins.
 December 22, 1995: Kevin Maas was signed as a free agent by the Twins.

Regular season

On May 7, the Twins played their longest game ever—in terms of time—losing in 17 innings to Cleveland after 6 hours and 36 minutes.
May 17 – Kirby Puckett scores his 1000th run, at the Metrodome.
May 26 – Kirby Puckett gets his 1000th RBI, at the Metrodome. 
The lone representative of the Twins in the All-Star Game was outfielder Kirby Puckett.
On September 13, three Seattle pitchers struck out eighteen Twins, which set a team record for batting futility.
The highest paid Twin in 1995 was Kirby Puckett at $6,300,000, followed by Rick Aguilera at $4,3500,000.

Offense

Only three players had particularly solid years: second baseman Chuck Knoblauch and outfielders Kirby Puckett and Marty Cordova.  Puckett did not know that this would be his last year, but it was a solid one.  He would be the team's lone all-star representative.  Knoblauch won his first Silver Slugger Award.  Cordova had a great year for a rookie, and won the Rookie of the Year award.

Pitching

The starting rotation was uncertain.  Surprisingly, the only certainty was that rookie Brad Radke would get the ball every fifth game.  He made 28 starts, but the other pitchers were either injury-prone, inconsistent, or traded by the end of the year, with Kevin Tapani making 20 starts, Mike Trombley 18, Frank Rodriguez 16, Scott Erickson 15, and Jose Parra 12.  Closer Rick Aguilera would also be traded midway through the season.  He earned 12 saves while Dave Stevens earned 10.  Aguilera, Rich Robertson, and Mark Guthrie were the only regular pitchers with ERAs under 5.

Defense

Like most of Tom Kelly's teams, the defense was capable. Matt Walbeck was the starting catcher, backed up by Matt Merullo. Scott Stahoviak played in 69 games at first base.  Although he was not a good hitter, he had a .998 fielding percentage that year.  Knoblauch capably manned second base. Scott Leius played reasonably well at third in his last year with the Twins. Pat Meares continued his decent play at shortstop in his third year with the Twins.  The regular outfielders were Puckett, Cordova, and Rich Becker.

Notable Transactions

 April 6, 1994: Carl Willis was signed as a free agent by the Twins.
 May 4, 1994: Carl Willis was released by the Twins.
 May 16, 1994: Kevin Campbell was released by the Twins.
 June 1, 1994: 1994 Major League Baseball draft
Mark Redman was drafted by the Twins in the 1st round (13th pick).
Doug Mientkiewicz was drafted by the Twins in the 5th round.
 July 6, 1994: Rick Aguilera was traded by the Twins to the Boston Red Sox for pitcher Frank Rodriguez and a player to be named later. The Red Sox completed the deal by sending J. J. Johnson (minors) to the Twins on October 11.
 July 7, 1994: Scott Erickson was traded by the Twins to the Baltimore Orioles for pitcher Scott Klingenbeck and a player to be named later.  The Orioles completed the trade by sending Kimera Bartee to the Twins on September 19.
 July 31, 1994: Kevin Tapani and Mark Guthrie were traded by the Twins to the Los Angeles Dodgers for Ron Coomer, Greg Hansell, José Parra, and a player to be named later. The Dodgers completed the deal by sending Chris Latham to the Twins on October 30.
 October 9, 1995: Luis Rivas was signed by the Minnesota Twins as an amateur free agent.

Season standings

Record vs. opponents

Roster

Player stats

Batting

Starters by position
Note: G = Games played; AB = At bats; H = Hits; Avg. = Batting average; HR = Home runs; RBI = Runs batted in

Other batters
Note: G = Games played; AB = At bats; H = Hits; Avg. = Batting average; HR = Home runs; RBI = Runs batted in

Pitching

Starting pitchers
Note: G = Games pitched; IP = Innings pitched; W = Wins; L = Losses; ERA = Earned run average; SO = Strikeouts

Other pitchers
Note: G = Games pitched; IP = Innings pitched; W = Wins; L = Losses; ERA = Earned run average; SO = Strikeouts

Relief pitchers
Note: G = Games pitched; W = Wins; L = Losses; SV = Saves; ERA = Earned run average; SO = Strikeouts

Other post-season awards
Calvin R. Griffith Award (Most Valuable Twin) – Chuck Knoblauch
Joseph W. Haynes Award (Twins Pitcher of the Year) – Brad Radke
Bill Boni Award (Twins Outstanding Rookie) – Marty Cordova
Charles O. Johnson Award (Most Improved Twin) – Pedro Muñoz
The above awards are voted on by the Twin Cities chapter of the BBWAA
Carl R. Pohlad Award (Outstanding Community Service) – Kirby Puckett
Sherry Robertson Award (Twins Outstanding Farm System Player) – Javier Valentín

Farm system

References

External links
Player stats from www.baseball-reference.com
Team info from www.baseball-almanac.com
Twins history through the 1990s, from www.mlb.com
1995 Standings

Minnesota Twins seasons
Minnesota Twins
Twins